American Eclipse is a book by David Baron about the popular impression of the 1878 solar eclipse as observed across the United States. Its full subtitle is, "A Nation's Epic Race to Catch the Shadow of the Moon and Win the Glory of the World".

Further reading

See also 

 Solar eclipse of August 21, 2017, the total eclipse visible across the contiguous United States that coincided with the book's release

External links 
 

2017 non-fiction books
American history books
English-language books
Books about scientists
Astronomy books
History books about the United States
History books about science
19th-century solar eclipses
Boni & Liveright books
1878 in the United States